The Manitoba Liberal Party field many candidates in the 1977 federal election.  One of its candidates was elected: Lloyd Axworthy, later a federal cabinet minister.  The party's leader, Charles Huband, was defeated in his constituency.

Some candidates have their own biography pages; information about others may be found on this page.

Norman Stapon (Kildonan)
Norman Stapon was a member of Winnipeg City Council from 1971 to 1977.  He was first elected for Springfield Heights in 1971 as a candidate of the Independent Citizens' Election Committee, and was re-elected in 1974.  He did not seek re-election in 1977.  Stapon attempted to return to city council in 1989, but was defeated.

Don Marks (Point Douglas)
Don Marks received 769 votes (15.63%), finishing third against New Democrat Don Malinowski.  He later became a noted writer, director and producer.

1977